Camel are an English progressive rock band formed in Guildford, Surrey, in 1971. Led by guitarist Andrew Latimer, they have released fourteen studio albums and fourteen singles, plus numerous live albums and DVDs. Without achieving mass popularity, the band gained a cult following in the 1970s with albums such as Mirage (1974) and The Snow Goose (1975). They moved into a jazzier, more commercial direction in the early 1980s, but then went on an extended hiatus. Since 1991 the band has been independent, releasing albums on their own label.

Despite no new studio releases since 2002, the band performed on tour as recently as 2018. Their music has influenced artists including Marillion, Opeth and Steven Wilson. Music journalist Mark Blake described Camel as "the great unsung heroes of 70s prog rock".

History

1970s

Andrew Latimer (guitar), Andy Ward (drums), and Doug Ferguson (bass) had been playing as a trio called the Brew around the Guildford, Surrey area of England. In early 1971 they auditioned to be the back-up band for singer/songwriter Phillip Goodhand-Tait and appeared on his album I Think I'll Write a Song on DJM Records. They then recruited keyboardist Peter Bardens and after an initial gig to fulfill a Bardens commitment under the name Peter Bardens' On, they changed their name to Camel. Their first gig under that name was at Waltham Forest Technical College, London supporting Wishbone Ash in December 1971.

In August 1972 Camel signed with MCA Records and their eponymous debut album Camel was released in early 1973. The record was not a success and the band moved to the Deram Records division of Decca Records (UK). In 1974 they released their second album, the critically acclaimed Mirage, on which Latimer showed he was also adept on flute. Although failing to chart at home, it gained success in the United States, prompting a three-month tour there.

Released in 1975, the instrumental concept album The Snow Goose, inspired by the Paul Gallico short story of the same name, was the breakthrough album that brought Camel wider attention and success. However, the album attracted a lawsuit from Gallico. It is often reported that Gallico brought the suit because he "loathed smoking" and thought the band were related to the cigarette brand. In reality Gallico described himself as "an addict of the vice in all its blackest forms" and his objection was simply on the grounds of copyright infringement. Camel accordingly added the prefix Music inspired by... to the album's front cover and removed the story notes from the back cover. The album's success led to a prestigious appearance at Royal Albert Hall with the London Symphony Orchestra in October 1975.

The band's fourth album, Moonmadness (1976), was the last to feature the original lineup. Mel Collins was added to the band on saxophone and flute for the subsequent tour. Drummer Ward was pushing for a move into jazz, which caused bassist Ferguson to quit the band in early 1977. Ferguson formed the band Headwaiter and later became a property developer.

Richard Sinclair (formerly of Caravan) replaced Ferguson, and Mel Collins joined the band in an official capacity. This lineup released Rain Dances (1977) and Breathless (1978). The latter was the last album to feature Bardens, who announced his departure before the supporting tour. He was replaced by two keyboard players both recruited from Caravan: Dave Sinclair (cousin of Richard) and Jan Schelhaas. The Sinclair cousins both left the band after the tour, replaced by keyboardist Kit Watkins and bassist Colin Bass. This lineup recorded the more commercial I Can See Your House from Here (1979); the album's cover, photographed and designed by Gered Mankowitz, is a manipulated photographic image of a crucified astronaut looking at Earth.

1980s
The 1981 release Nude was a concept album based on a true story of Japanese soldier Hiroo Onoda. Duncan Mackay provided most of the keyboards in lieu of Watkins and Schelhaas, who were involved in other projects but returned for the tour. This was the first album to feature lyrics by Latimer's future wife Susan Hoover. In mid-1981, Ward stopped playing drums due to alcohol and drug abuse and Camel quietly disbanded.

Without a band, but with a contract to fulfill and pressure from Decca for a hit song, Latimer was joined by an array of guest and session musicians at Abbey Road Studios in early 1982. The album The Single Factor was released later that year, reaching no. 57 in the UK. Another lineup featuring keyboardist Ton Scherpenzeel (of Dutch prog-rock band Kayak) and drummer Paul Burgess (ex-10cc) released the album Stationary Traveller in 1984. Camel's contract with Decca expired in late 1984, while Latimer prevailed in a legal dispute with a former manager. Latimer moved to the United States and disbanded the group again.

1990s
After a seven-year hiatus, Latimer revived the Camel name in 1991 and released the album, Dust and Dreams under his own independent label Camel Productions. The album featured several players who had appeared on the group's two previous albums in the early 1980s. Keyboardist Mickey Simmonds, who had previously backed Mike Oldfield and Fish, joined in 1992.

In 1992, a man named Roy Clay approached former Camel drummer Andy Ward and claimed to be a fan of the band as well as an experienced music manager. Clay proposed a Camel reunion tour; Ward supported the scheme but Peter Bardens was the only other former member to show interest. Clay then enlisted some former members of Caravan and attempted to promote the band as a legitimate new lineup of Camel, but a copyright challenge from Latimer forced a name change. Under the name Mirage, this group conducted a short tour in late 1994 and released a live album. The members of Mirage were never compensated, and Clay's fraudulent practices were addressed in a 1995 song by Caravan. Also under Clay's management, Bardens led another band under the name Mirage that released a live album in 1996. Clay also sold counterfeit Camel merchandise, and several years later was convicted of fraud and forgery.

In the meantime, Latimer and Hoover wrote Harbour of Tears (a nickname for Cobh Harbour in Ireland from which many sailed to the United States during the Great Famine) under the Camel name, which was released in 1996. In 1999 Latimer, drummer Dave Stewart, bassist Colin Bass, and keyboardist Ton Scherpenzeel recorded Rajaz, a record inspired by an ancient Arabic poetic metre of the same name that reflects the rhythm of camel footsteps in the desert.

2000s-2010s

In 2001, Latimer assembled another new lineup with Bass, drummer Denis Clement, and keyboardist Guy LeBlanc. The band released the album A Nod and a Wink in 2002. The album was dedicated to former member Peter Bardens, who had died early that year, The group was inactive for much of the following decade as Latimer received treatment for myelofibrosis.

After Latimer's recovery, Camel returned to touring in 2013, including full performances of The Snow Goose. A new and extended version of that album was released in November 2013. LeBlanc withdrew from touring in 2014 due to illness and died in 2015; he was replaced by a returning Ton Scherpenzeel.

Latimer was presented with a Lifetime Achievement award at Orange Amplification's 2014 Progressive Music Awards, and the 2013-14 Snow Goose tour was nominated in the category of Live Event. The band continued to tour throughout the decade, and a live DVD recorded at Royal Albert Hall was released in early 2020. Latimer continues to write new music, though the band has not released a studio album since 2002.

Musical style
Camel have been described as a "symphonic prog rock band". Predominantly instrumental, Camel's music combines elements from rock, pop, jazz, blues, folk, classical and electronica. Though they are not from Canterbury, they have long been associated with the Canterbury scene due to their many historical connections with Caravan and other Canterbury progressive rock musicians.

Legacy
Camel have been acknowledged as one of the principal influences on the neo-progressive rock subgenre which emerged in the 1980s and produced Marillion as its most successful band. Former Marillion lead singer Fish said of his first impression of the band: "I thought they were a lot like Camel."
 The album Fuera de Tiempo by Argentinean band Rockaphonia contains three Camel tribute covers.
 A tribute band, The Humps, in Israel, routinely performs some of the band's material.
 Another tribute band named Fritha (after the song on The Snow Goose album) is performing in Japan 
 In Sweden there is a tribute band named Lady Fantasy (after the song on the Mirage album).
 A band named Raha in Iran is doing covers of Camel songs.
 In Egypt, Andromida is also doing covers of Camel amongst their set.
 In 2010, the Norwegian progressive rock band Mirage, named after the title of Camel's second album, included Camel songs among a set of Yes, Jethro Tull and King Crimson pieces.
 In Lebanon, a band called Babel (as in 'Babylon') improvised over Camel's song "Storm Clouds" on 28 October 2011.
 Mikael Åkerfeldt of Swedish progressive death metal band Opeth has cited Camel to be an influence for the song "Hessian Peel" and previously joked on the Lamentations (Live at Shepherd's Bush Empire 2003) DVD that material from their Damnation (2003) album was a "rip-off" of Camel.
 Steven Wilson of Porcupine Tree has cited Camel as an influence. In a 2013 interview he expressed his interest to remix the classic Camel albums. Latimer later in 2013 replied positively to Wilson's interest.
 Rick Astley, in an interview with Billboard in 2016, referred to Camel touring The Snow Goose as his first ever concert, stating "it blew my mind".
 Andy Tillison of The Tangent recorded a track called Music Inspired by Music Inspired by The Snow Goose as a tribute to Camel, released on his 2016 solo album (Machte Es) Durch.

Members

Current members
Andrew Latimer – guitar, flute, recorder, keyboards, percussion, vocals 
Colin Bass – bass, acoustic guitar, keyboards, vocals 
Denis Clement – drums, percussion, keyboards, fretless bass, recorder 
Peter Jones – keyboards, synthesisers, saxophones, vocals

Discography

Camel (1973)
Mirage (1974)
The Snow Goose (1975)
Moonmadness (1976)
Rain Dances (1977)
Breathless (1978)
I Can See Your House from Here (1979)
Nude (1981)
The Single Factor (1982)
Stationary Traveller (1984)
Dust and Dreams (1991)
Harbour of Tears (1996)
Rajaz (1999)
A Nod and a Wink (2002)

References

External links

 Camel Productions, the official Camel website
 
 Pink-Camel - A Camel Fan Project
 Camel biography by Stephen Thomas Erlewine, discography and album reviews, credits & releases at AllMusic.com
 
 Camel albums to be listened as stream at Play.Spotify.com
 Camel Performances

 
Canterbury scene
Decca Records artists
Deram Records artists
English progressive rock groups
Symphonic rock groups